3-MCPD (3-monochloropropane-1,2-diol or 3-chloropropane-1,2-diol) is an organic chemical compound with the formula HOCH2CH(OH)CH2Cl.  It is a colorless liquid.  It is a versatile multifunctional building block.  The compound has attracted attention as the most common member of chemical food contaminants known as chloropropanols.  It is suspected to be carcinogenic in humans.

It is produced in foods treated at high temperatures with hydrochloric acid to speed up protein hydrolysis. As a byproduct of this process, chloride can react with the glycerol backbone of lipids to produce 3-MCPD.  3-MCPD can also occur in foods that have been in contact with materials containing epichlorohydrin-based wet-strength resins which are used in the production of some tea bags and sausage casings.

In 2009, 3-MCPD was found in some East Asian and Southeast Asian sauces such as oyster sauce, Hoisin sauce, and soy sauce. Using hydrochloric acid is far faster than traditional slow fermentation. A 2013 European Food Safety Authority report indicated margarine, vegetable oils (excluding walnut oil), preserved meats, bread, and fine bakery wares as major sources in Europe.

3-MCPD can also be found in many paper products treated with polyamidoamine-epichlorohydrin wet-strength resins.

Absorption and toxicity
The International Agency for Research on Cancer has classified 3-MCPD as Group 2B, "possibly carcinogenic to humans". 3-MCPD is carcinogenic in rodents via a non-genotoxic mechanism.  It is able to cross the blood-testis barrier and blood–brain barrier.  The oral  of 3-chloro-1,2-propanediol is 152 mg/kg bodyweight in rats.

3-MCPD also has male antifertility effects  and can be used as a rat chemosterilant.

Legal limits
The joint Food Standards Australia New Zealand (FSANZ) set a limit for 3-MCPD in soy sauce of 0.02 mg/kg, in line with European Commission standards which came into force in the EU in April 2002.

History
In 2000, a survey of soy sauces and similar products available in the UK was carried out by the Joint Ministry of Agriculture, Fisheries and Food/Department of Health Food Safety and Standards Group (JFSSG) and reported more than half of the samples collected from retail outlets contained various levels of 3-MCPD.

In 2001, the United Kingdom Food Standards Agency (FSA) found in tests of various oyster sauces and soy sauces that 22% of samples contained 3-MCPD at levels considerably higher than those deemed safe by the European Union. About two-thirds of these samples also contained a second chloropropanol called 1,3-dichloropropane-2-ol (1,3-DCP) which experts advise should not be present at any levels in food.  Both chemicals have the potential to cause cancer and the Agency recommended that the affected products be withdrawn from shelves and avoided.

In 2001, the FSA and Food Standards Australia New Zealand (FSANZ) singled out brands and products imported from Thailand, China, Hong Kong, and Taiwan.  Brands named in the British warning include Golden Mountain, King Imperial, Pearl River Bridge, Golden Mark, Kimlan, Golden Swan, Sinsin, Tung Chun, and Wanjasham soy sauce.  Knorr soy sauce was also implicated, as well as Uni-President Enterprises Corporation creamy soy sauce from Taiwan, Silver Swan soy sauce from the Philippines, Ta Tun soy bean sauce from Taiwan, Tau Vi Yeu seasoning sauce and Soya bean sauce from Vietnam, Zu Miao Fo Shan soy superior sauce and Mushroom soy sauce from China and Golden Mountain and Lee Kum Kee chicken marinade.
Between 2002 and 2004, relatively high levels of 3-MCPD and other chloropropanols were found in soy sauce and other foods in China.

In 2007, in Vietnam, 3-MCPD was found in toxic levels.  In 2004, the HCM City Institute of Hygiene and Public Health found 33 of 41 sample of soy sauce with high rates of 3-MCPD, including six samples with up to 11,000 to 18,000 times more 3-MPCD than permitted, an increase over 23 to 5,644 times in 2001, The newspaper Thanh Nien Daily commented, "Health agencies have known that Vietnamese soy sauce, the country's second most popular sauce after fish sauce, has been chock full of cancer agents since at least 2001."

In March 2008, in Australia, "carcinogens" were found in soy sauces, and Australians were advised to avoid soy sauce.

In November 2008, Britain's Food Standards Agency reported a wide range of household name food products from sliced bread to crackers, beefburgers and cheese with 3-MCPD above safe limits.  Relatively high levels of the chemical were found in popular brands such as Mother's Pride, Jacobs crackers, John West, Kraft Dairylea and McVitie's Krackawheat.  The same study also found relatively high levels in a range of supermarket own-brands, including Tesco char-grilled beefburgers, Sainsbury's Hot 'n Spicy Chicken Drumsticks and digestive biscuits from Asda. The highest levels of 3-MCPD found in a non- soy sauce product, crackers, was 134 μg per kg. The highest level of 3-MCPD found in soy sauce was 93,000 μg per kg, 700 times higher. The legal limit for 3-MCPD coming in next year will be 20 μg per kg, but the safety guideline on daily intake is 120 μg for a 60 kg person per day.

In 2016, the occurrence of 3-MCPD in selected paper products (coffee filters, tea bags, disposable paper hot beverage cups, milk paperboard containers, paper towels) sold on the Canadian and German market was reported and the transfer of 3-MCPD from those products to beverages was investigated. Exposure to 3-MCPD from packaging material would likely constitute only a small percentage of overall dietary exposure when compared to the intake of processed oils/fats containing 3-MCPD equivalent (in form of fatty acid esters) which are often present at levels of about 0.2-2 μg/g.

References

External links

Chloropropanols (WHO Food Additive Series 32)

Vicinal diols
IARC Group 2B carcinogens
Organochlorides
Spermatotoxicants
Halohydrins